Branimir Đokić (Serbian Cyrillic: Бранимир Ђокић) (born 6 February 1950) is a Serbian folk accordionist. He has had his own ensemble band since the early 1970s and has also been known to have played for some major artists: Šaban Šaulić, Mitar Mirić, Šerif Konjević, Kemal Malovčić, Zorica Brunclik and others.

Đokić attended the high music school "Stanković" in Belgrade. He presented himself to the audience as outstanding instrumentalist on accordion, winning the first prize at the traditional competition in Sokobanja, 1964. By the next year, Branimir became one of the best known instrumental soloists on accordion in the former Yugoslavia.

Later, he joined the Folk Orchestra of Radio Belgrade, where he was oriented in the field, in which he is today, by Rade Jašarević and Boki Milošević.

Discography
Singles
Kola (Kaletovo kolo) - PGP RTB (1965)
Kola (Čubursko kolo) - PGP RTB (1966)
Kola (Uzičko kolo) - PGP RTB (1967)
Kola (Ciganski urnebes) - BeogradDisk (1968)
Nova kola (Čivijaški džumbus) - PGP RTB (1970)
Nova kola (Zvezdino kolo) - PGP RTB (1975)
Kola (Mitraljez kolo) - PGP RTB (1977)

Albums
Zlatna harmonika (Kola) - PGP RTB (1972)
Kola (Kola) - PGP RTB (1973)
Kola (Kola) - PGP RTB (1976)
Veliki uspesi (Kola) - Diskos (1984)

References

1950 births
Living people
Yugoslav musicians
Serbian accordionists
Musicians from Šabac
21st-century accordionists